"Across the Night" was the fourth and final single released by rock band Silverchair from their fourth album, Diorama. It is the first track on Diorama, and is a major departure from their previous, grungy sound which was featured on Frogstomp, which was released in 1995. This more progressive type of songwriting is also present on Silverchair's final album, Young Modern. A video was created for the song in the style of early 1920s cinema, featuring acclaimed Australian actor Guy Pearce.

The Sean Gilligan and Sarah-Jane Woulahan directed music video was nominated for Best Video at the ARIA Music Awards of 2003.

Track listing
Australian CD single (ELEVENCD15)
 "Across the Night"
 "Tuna in the Brine" (demo)
 "One Way Mule" (demo)
 "Luv Your Life" (demo)
 "Across the Night" (demo)

Australian DVD single  (ELEVENDVD15)
 "Across the Night" (music video)
 "After All These Years" (music video)
 "The Greatest View" (live at the 2002 ARIA Awards)

Australian 12" promo (limited to 900, now deleted) (ELEVENV15)
 "Across the Night"
 "Tuna in the Brine"

Charts

References

2003 singles
Silverchair songs
Songs written by Daniel Johns
2002 songs
Eleven: A Music Company singles
Virgin Records singles
Song recordings produced by David Bottrill

pt:Across the Night